Miss Serbia is a national Beauty pageant in Serbia.

President
Vesna De Vinča president of Miss Serbia is a TV author, journalist, TV director, editor, and screenwriter. Since 1993, she has been the TV programme editor on the documentary programme, RTS, the biggest radio and TV network in Serbia & Montenegro. Her TV programs are broadcast via satellite. She has been running her own TV production company since 2004.

Titleholders

Big Four pageants representatives
The following women have represented Serbia in the Big Four international beauty pageants, the four major international beauty pageants for women. These are Miss World, Miss Universe, Miss International and Miss Earth.

Miss Universe Serbia

Miss Serbia has started to send a Miss Universe Serbia to Miss Universe from 2007. On occasion, when the winner does not qualify (due to age) for either contest, a runner-up is sent. Since Serbia and Montenegro split to two countries, Serbia has not achievement from debuting in 2007 to present.

Miss World Serbia

Miss International Serbia

Miss Earth Serbia

See also
 Miss Serbia and Montenegro
 Miss Serbia by year
 Serbia at international beauty pageants

References

External links 

 
Serbian awards
Serbia